This is a list of compositions by Arthur Bliss.

Bliss's works have been catalogued by Lewis Foreman, and "F" numbers are now commonly used to identify his music.

Stage

Operas
F. 97, The Olympians (1948)
F. 96, The Beggar's Opera (1952)
F. 98, Tobias and the Angel (1960)

Ballets
F. 8, Rout (a ballet in one scene) (1920?)
F. 119, Melee Fantasque (1921)
F. 7, Narcissus and Echo (1931; based on Rhapsody)
F. 2, Checkmate (1937)
F. 6, Miracle in the Gorbals (1944)
F. 1, Adam Zero (1946)
F. 5, The Lady of Shallot (1958)
F. 3, Diversions (based on Music for Strings) (1961)
F. 4, Frontier (based on music from Quintet for Oboe and String Quartet) (1969?)
F. 9, A Royal Offering (based on A Colour Symphony) (1977)

Incidental Music
F. 85, As You Like It (1919)
F. 86, King Solomon (1924)
F. 87, Summer Day's Dream - violin and oboe (1949)

Orchestral
F. 119, Melee Fantasque (revision) (1921/1937/1965)
F. 133, Two Studies (1920)
F. 106, A Colour Symphony (1921/1932)
F. 127, Pyonepsion (last movement of A Colour Symphony) (1922)
F. 102, Bliss: One Step (1923)
F. 134, Twone, the house of Felicity (1923)
F. 124, Polonaise (1925)
F. 116, Hymn to Apollo (1926/1965)
F. 117, Introduction and Allegro (1926/1937)
F. 123, Music for Strings (1935)
F. 94, March, The Phoenix - homage to France (1944)
F. 120, Memorial Concert (1946)
F. 120, Theme and Cadenza (from "Memorial Concert", radio play by Trudy Bliss) (1949)
F. 126, Processional (1953)
F. 101, A Birthday Greeting for Her Majesty, (1955)
F. 118, Meditation on a Theme by John Blow (1955)
F. 114, Edinburgh Overture (1956)
F. 113, Discourse for Orchestra (1957/1965)
F. 104, Ceremonial Prelude (1965)
F. 93, March in homage of a great man (1965)
F. 122, Metamorphic Variations (1972)
F. 132, Two Contrasts for String Orchestra (1972)

Concertante
F. 109, Concerto for Piano, Strings, Tenor and Percussion (1920/1923)
F. 110, Concerto for Two Pianos and Orchestra (1924)
F. 108, Concerto for Piano in B-flat major (1938; premiered by Solomon)
F. 111, Violin Concerto (1953; premiered by Alfredo Campoli in 1955)
F. 107, Cello Concerto (1970; premiered by Mstislav Rostropovich)

Vocal/Choral Orchestral
F. 33, Pastoral 'Lie strewn the white flocks' (1928)
F. 32, Morning Heroes (1930)
F. 34, Songs of Welcome (1954)
F. 28, Beatitudes, The (1961)
F. 31, Mary of Magdala (1962)
F. 30, Golden Cantata (1963)
F. 29, God save the Queen (1969)
F. 36, World is charged with the Grandeur of God, The (1969)
F. 35, Two Ballads (1971)

Chamber music
-, Trio for piano, clarinet and cello (1909)
-, Quartet for piano, clarinet, cello and timpani (1910??)
F. 23, String Quartet in A major (1913)
F. 18, Piano Quartet in A minor (1915)
F. 17, Fugue for String Quartet (1916)
F. 22, Piano Quintet (1919) 
F. 16, Conversations (1920)
F. 24, String Quartet (1923) 
F. 190, Allegro (from incomplete string quartet) (1927)
F. 21, Quintet for oboe and strings (1927)
F. 20, Quintet for Clarinet and String Quartet (1932)
F. 91, Sonata for Viola and Piano (1933)
F. 25, String Quartet No.1 B-flat major (1941)
F. 26, String Quartet No.2 (1950)
F. 27, Toast to the Royal Household (1961)
F. 19, Play a penta (1971)
-, Prelude for Brass, Percussion, Piccolo and Double Bassoon (1974?) (also known as Fanfare for Lancaster)

Instrumental

Piano
F. 142, May Zeeh (1910)
F. 147, Suite (1912)
F. 139, Intermezzo (1912)
F. 152, Valse Fantastiques (1913)
F. 155, Rout (two piano arrangement) (1920?)
F. 138, Bliss: One Step (1923)
F. 141, Masks (1924)
F. 148, Suite (1925)
F. 149, Toccata (1925)
F. 151, Two Interludes (1925)
F. 144, Rout Trot, The (1927)
F. 146, Study (1927)
F. 140, Karen's Piece (1940/1941)
F. 145, Piano Sonata (1952) (written for Noel Mewton-Wood, who had played the Piano Concerto to Bliss's great satisfaction; first recording 1960 by Marguerite Wolf)
F. 143, Miniature Scherzo (1969)
F. 154, Fun and Games (three hands/two pianos) (1970)
F. 150, Triptych (1970)
F. 153, Wedding Suite, A (1974)

Organ
F. 137, Praeludium (1971)

Other
F. 89, Intermezzo for Viola and Piano (1914?)
F. 192, Violin Sonata (incomplete) (1914)
F. 92, Two Pieces for Clarinet (1916)
F. 89a, Andante Tranquillo e Legato (1926??)
F. 91, Viola Sonata (1933), premiered by Lionel Tertis and Solomon
F. 88, Enid’s Blast (1968)
F. 90, Music for a Prince (1970)

Vocal

Voice and Ensemble
F. 160, Madam Noy (1918)
F. 161, Rhapsody (1919)
F. 162, Rout (1920)
F. 165, Two Nursery Rhymes for Voice, Clarinet in A (or Viola), and Piano (1920)
F. 164, The Tempest, (1921)
F. 166, Women of Yu’eh (1923)
F. 158, Four Songs (1927)
F. 163, Serenade for Baritone and Orchestra (1929)
F. 163, Two Love Songs (from the Serenade) (1929)
F. 157, The Enchantress, (1951)
F. 156, Elegiac Sonnet (1954)
F. 159, A Knot of Riddles, (1963)
F. 35, Two Ballads (1971)
F. 158, Four Songs (1973)

Voice and Piano
F. 181, Tis time I think by Wenlock Town (1914)
F. 173, The Hammers, (1915)
F. 182, The Tramps, (1916)
F. 188a, La Serva Padrona (Pergolesi) (1919)
F. 179, Three Romantic Songs (1921)
F. 180, Three Songs (1923/1972)
F. 170, Ballad of the Four Seasons, The (1923)
F. 178, Three Jolly Gentlemen (1923)
F. 185, When I was one and twenty (1923)
F. 172, Fallow deer at the lonely house, The (1924)
F. 168, At the Window (1925)
F. 174, Rich or Poor (1925)
F. 171, Child's prayer, A (1926)
F. 177, Simples (1932)
F. 176, Seven American Poems (1940)
F. 184, Two American Poems (1940)
F. 169, Auvergnat (1943)
F. 191, Pack clouds away (incomplete) (1960s)
F. 193, Song of a man who has come through (incomplete) (1960s)
F. 167, Angels of the Mind (1969)
F. 175, Sailing or Flying (1970)
F. 183, Tulips (1970)

Choral
-, When wilt thou save thy people? (1943??)
F. 37, Aubade for Coronation Morning (1953)
F. 51, Seek the Lord (1956)
F. 38, Birthday songs for a Royal child (1959)
F. 54, Stand up and bless the Lord (1960)
F. 40, Cradle Song of a newborn child (1963)
F. 45, O give thanks unto the Lord (1965)
F. 41, He is the Way (1967)
F. 50, River Music (1967)
F. 55, Sweet Day, so cool (1967)
F. 56, Three Songs for Girls and Boys (1967)
F. 42, Lord, who shall abide in thy tabernacle? (1968)
F. 46, One, two, buckle my shoe (1968)
F. 48, Prayer to the infant Jesus, A (1968)
F. 39, Christ is Alive! Let Christians sing (1970)
F. 44, Ode for Sir William Walton (1972)
F. 47, Prayer of St Francis of Assisi (1972)
F. 49, Put thou thy trust in the Lord (1972)
F. 43, Mar Portugues (1973)
F. 52, Shield of Faith (1974)
F. 53, Sing, Mortals (1974)

Hymns
-, Pen Selwood – Hymn Tune (1967?)
-, Santa Barbara – Hymn Tune (1967??)
-, Mortlake – Hymn Tune (1971?)

Brass/Military Band
F. 113, Kenilworth (1936)
F. 12, First Guards (1956)
F. 11, Call to Adventure (1962)
F. 10, Belmont Variations, The (1963)
F. 14, Linburn Air (1965)
F. 15, Salute to Lehigh University (1968)

Fanfares
F. 62, Fanfare for a Political Address (1921)
F. 63, Fanfare for Heroes (1930)
F. 59, Dominion Greetings (1935)
F. 83, Three Jubilant and Three Solemn Fanfares (1935/1943)
F. 61, Fanfare for a Dignified Occasion (1938)
F. 57, Birthday Fanfare for Henry Wood (1944)
F. 75, Peace Fanfare for Children (1944)
F. 79, Salute to Painting, A (1953)
F. 80, Salute to the RAF, A (1956)
F. 82, Service of the Order of the Bath (1956)
F. 68, Fanfare preceding the National Anthem (1960)
F. 74, Let the People Sing - Two Fanfares (1960)
F. 78, Royal Fanfares and Interludes (1960)
F. 81, Salute to the Royal Society, a (1960)
F. 71, Greetings to a City (1961)
F. 84, Wedding of Princess Margaret, Music for (1961?)
F. 70, Gala Fanfare (1962)
F. 72, High Sheriff's Fanfare (1963)
F. 67, Fanfare, Homage to Shakespeare (1964)
F. 64, Fanfare for the Commonwealth Arts Festival (1965)
F. 77, Right of the Line, The (1965/1982 poth.)
F. 69, Fanfare: Prelude for Orchestra ‘Macclesfield’ (1966)
F. 65, Fanfare for the Lord Mayor of London (1967)
F. 76, Prince of Wales Investiture Music (1969)
F. 158, Birthday Greetings to the Croydon Symphony Orchestra (1971)
F. 60, Fanfare for a Coming of Age (1973)
F. 66, Fanfare for the National Fund for Crippling Diseases (1973)
F. 84, Wedding of Princess Anne, Music for (1973)
F. 73, Lancaster-prelude (1974)

Orchestral Arrangements
F. 188, Fire Dance (arr. of work by Sinding)
F. 189, Set of act Tunes and Dances (Purcell) (1921)
F. 186, Das alte jahr vergangen is (Bach) (1932)

Arrangements for Brass/Military Band
F. 187, Three Bach Chorales from St John Passion (1960)

Music for media

Film Music
F. 131, Things to Come (1934)
F. 112, Conquest of the Air (1936)
F. 103, Caesar and Cleopatra (1945) (not used; replaced by a new score by Georges Auric)
F. 121, Men of Two Worlds (1945)
F. 125, Présence au combat (1945)
F. 105, Christopher Columbus (1949)
F. 135, War in the Air (1954)
F. 95, Welcome the Queen (1954)
F. 129, Seven Waves Away (1956)

Music for Radio
F. 136, Your question answered (1944)
F. 115, Heritage of Britain (1950)

Music for Television
F. 99, ABC Television Signature and Interval Music (1956)
F. 100, An Age of Kings (1960)
F. 128, Royal Palace Music for The Royal Palaces of Britain (1966)
F. 130, Spirit of the Age (1975)

Lost
-, Elizabethan Suite (??)
-, March and Valse des Fleurs (arr. Tchaikovsky) (1910??)
-, Valses Melancoliques, Deuxième Preludes; Valse-Phantasie (1913??)
-, The Festival of Flora (arr. of Henry Purcell) (1927??)
-, Theme from Processional Interlude (1969)

References

For Film and TV credits see also BFI Screenonline Bliss, Sir Arthur (1891-1975) page, accessed 5 May 2021.

 
Bliss